House of Targ is a live music venue, arcade and pierogi restaurant in Ottawa, Canada. The venue opened April 17, 2014 with a live performance from Toronto band PUP. Owners 
Paul Granger, Mark McHale and Kevin Berger acquired a 10-year lease on the 1077 Bank street location. The 4,000 sq. ft. basement venue formerly housed the Bayou Blues bar, The New Bayou and The Underground.

Most of the bands booked belong to the rock, indie, alternative, punk, hardcore, metal, ska, synth categories. Some bands and artists that have performed at House of TARG include Pup, The Nils, Rational Youth, The Real McKenzies, UK Subs, Neil Hamburger, Angry Samoans, Agathocles, Extreme Noise Terror, Dead Brain Cells, David Liebe Hart, B.A. Johnston, Rich Aucoin, Chixdiggit, Anciients, Hibria, Dayglo Abortions, Screaming Females, The Courtneys, C. J. Ramone, Ian Blurton, Truckfighters, Bob Log III, Re-Animator, Gorod, Mike Krol, Weaves, Hard Skin, Antidote, Blanks 77, A Wilhelm Scream, Days N' Daze, Moon King, Surfer Blood, Pop. 1280, Downtown Boys, Duotang, The Interrupters, Dave Hause, Dilly Dally, White Lung, Diemonds, Dirty Dishes, The Balconies, DZ Deathrays, Dune Rats, The Pack A.D., The Dirty Nil, The Cave Singers, Said The Whale, Library Voices, No Joy, We Are The City, The Elwins, The Zolas, and Dutchess Says among many others. 

The concept behind the House of Targ name comes from the popular 1980 arcade game "Targ", which was the first machine donated to the space.

A monthly House of Targ Zine is put out and distributed around Ottawa.

In 2014, the venue had around twelve classic arcade games and eighteen "vintage pinball games".

References

Further reading
 
 
 

Music venues in Ottawa
Video arcades